Acianthera guimaraensii is a species of orchid.

guimaraensii